"Say Goodbye to Hollywood" is a song written and performed by Billy Joel, first released in 1976 on his album Turnstiles. It was originally released in the United States as the B-side to "I've Loved These Days" before being re-released a month later as an A-side single with "Stop in Nevada" as the B-side. However, the song achieved greater recognition in 1981 when a live version from Songs in the Attic was released as a single, with the live version of "Summer, Highland Falls" as a B-side. Joel wrote the song after moving back to New York City in 1975; he had previously relocated to Los Angeles in 1972 in an attempt to get out of an onerous record deal. The man who represents this song on the Turnstiles album is the man wearing sunglasses and holding a suitcase.

Production and influence
Joel has stated in his university lectures that he wrote the song with Ronnie Spector and The Ronettes song "Be My Baby" in mind. Indeed, Joel notes that the two songs share a very similar beat, recycling the iconic drum intro of "Be My Baby". The song's production was also specifically modeled on the "Wall of Sound" production method of her ex-husband Phil Spector, who produced "Be My Baby" in that manner. The song utilized a backing band throughout the track, with new instrumental layers appearing throughout the song, such as backup singers in the refrain and strings starting from the second verse. However, whether this effect had been achieved was in dispute, with biographer Mark Bego claiming it was successful in this regard, while music critic Stephen Holden disagreed.  Billboard said that it "has the intensity and flair of Phil Spector's early '60s classics."  Record World said that the live version "sounds better than the original," with "a perfect blend of concert spontaneity and studio clarity." Recognizing Joel's tribute, Ronnie Spector recorded her own cover version of "Say Goodbye to Hollywood" in 1977 with the E Street Band, soon after Joel released his first recording of the song on Turnstiles.

Covers
Ronnie Spector & the E Street Band single in 1976. Record World said that "Great and mystical forces have combined to make Ronnie's return (and her label debut) a smash. Miami Steve's production does her proud."
Bette Midler recorded a cover for her album Broken Blossom (1977). 
As previously noted, Ronnie Spector and the E Street Band released their version of "Say Goodbye to Hollywood" as a single in 1977.
Nigel Olsson released a version of the song as a single in 1978, but it did not chart.

Charts

References 

1975 songs
1978 singles
1981 singles
Songs written by Billy Joel
Billy Joel songs
Bette Midler songs
Nigel Olsson songs
Song recordings produced by Phil Ramone
Columbia Records singles
CBS Records singles
Live singles
Songs about Los Angeles
Songs about parting
Song recordings with Wall of Sound arrangements